Tessa is a feminine given name. Tessa or TESSA may also refer to:

 Tessa (novel), by Margit Sandemo
 Tessa (play), by Jean Giraudoux
 Tessa, Niger, a village and rural commune
 TESSA, the usual abbreviation for a Tax-exempt special savings account, a tax-privileged investment wrapper in the United Kingdom which was replaced by the ISA.
 TESSA, the Los Angeles Public Library online historical collections, after Tessa Kelso, (1863–1933), City librarian, 1889–1895
 Texas Severe Storms Association